Dameshek is a surname. Notable people with the surname include:

Dave Dameshek (born 1970), American television writer and radio personality
William Dameshek (1900–1969), American hematologist